Raymond III may refer to:

Raymond III, Count of Toulouse (10th century)
Raymond III of Rouergue (count 961–c.1008)
Raymond III of Pallars Jussà (count 1011–1047)
Raymond III, Count of Tripoli (r. 1152–1187)